Agoseris is a small genus of annual or perennial herbs in the family Asteraceae described as a genus in 1817.

Agoseris is native to North America, South America and the Falkland Islands.

In general appearance, Agoseris is reminiscent of dandelions and are sometimes called mountain dandelion or false dandelion. Like dandelions the plants are (mostly) stemless, the leaves forming a basal rosette, contain milky sap, produce several unbranched, stem-like flower stalks (peduncles), each flower stalk bearing a single, erect, liguliferous flower head that contains several florets, and the flower head maturing into a ball-like seed head of beaked achenes, each achene with a pappus of numerous, white  bristles.

Species
 Accepted species
 Agoseris apargioides - seaside agoseris  - CA OR WA 
 Agoseris aurantiaca - orange agoseris - USA and Canada from Rocky Mountains to Pacific; also Quebec 
 Agoseris chilensis - Chile 
 Agoseris coronopifolia - Patagonian agoseris - Chile, Argentina, Falkland Islands 
 Agoseris glauca - prairie agoseris - western USA + Canada from AK to Ont + NM 
 Agoseris grandiflora - grassland agoseris - CA OR WA ID NV MT UT BC 
 Agoseris heterophylla - annual agoseris - western USA + Canada + northwestern Mexico
 Agoseris hirsuta - Coast Range agoseris - CA  
 Agoseris laevigata  - Chile
 Agoseris × montana - North Park agoseris - CO WY 
 Agoseris monticola - Sierra Nevada agoseris - CA OR WA ID NV BC 
 Agoseris parviflora - steppe agoseris - western USA  
 Agoseris pterocarpa - Argentina 
 Agoseris retrorsa - spearleaf agoseris - CA OR WA NV UT

 Hybrids
 Agoseris × agrestis (A. glauca × A. parviflora) - Front Range agoseris - UT CO
 Agoseris × dasycarpa (A. glauca × A. monticola) - Modoc agoseris - CA OR
 Agoseris × elata (A. aurantiaca × A. grandiflora) - Willamette agoseris - CA OR WA BC

 Species formerly included
 Agoseris alpestris = Nothocalais alpestris
 Agoseris barbellulata = Nothocalais alpestris
 Agoseris cuspidata = Nothocalais cuspidata

Distribution
Agoseris is one of several groups of flowering plants that have a New World amphitropical distribution (occurring in temperate regions of both North and South America). Most species are found in cordilleran regions of western North America, being distributed from southern Yukon Territory and the panhandle of Alaska southward to northern Baja California, Arizona, and New Mexico, and from the Pacific coast eastward to the northern Great Plains. Disjunct, isolated populations occur on the Gaspe Peninsula and Otish Mountains (Monts Otish) of Quebec, near the Hudson Bay in Ontario, and on hills near the Arctic Ocean in the Northwest Territories of Canada. One species is native to the southern Andes Mountains of Argentina and Chile, southward to Patagonia, Tierra del Fuego, and the Falkland Islands.

References

External links
 USDA Plants Profile for Agoseris
 {http://www.calflora.org/cgi-bin/specieslist.cgi?where-genus=Agoseris  Calflora Database: Agoseris species index-links]
 Jepson Manual Treatment (TJM)
 Northernbushcraft.com: Edibility of Agoseris — identification and uses of edible parts.

 
Flora of North America
Asteraceae genera
Taxa named by Constantine Samuel Rafinesque